Hedley Glacier is a small glacier in the Kukri Hills of Victoria Land, Antarctica, flowing south from Mount Coates into Ferrar Glacier. It was named by the Western Journey Party of Robert Falcon Scott's British Antarctic Expedition, 1910–13, probably for Charles Hedley of the Australian Museum, whose studies and reports on the Mollusca contributed to Scott's expedition, and to the British Antarctic Expedition, 1907–09, led by Ernest Shackleton.

References

Glaciers of McMurdo Dry Valleys